Fukumitsu may refer to:

Fukumitsu, Toyama, a town in Nishitonami District, Toyama, Japan
Minami-Fukumitsu, a power grid station

People with the surname
, Japanese high jumper
, Japanese footballer

Japanese-language surnames